Mohammad Sharif (born 12 December  1985 in Narayanganj, Dhaka) is a Bangladeshi cricketer.  He is a right-handed player. The right-arm pacer has returned to cricket after a short break. He has played for Bangladesh, Dhaka Warriors, ICL Bangladesh, Bangladesh A, Barisal Division, Biman Bangladesh Airlines, Bangladesh Invitation XI, Dhaka Division, Khulna Division, Sylhet Sixers, Rangpur Riders, Bangladesh Central Zone, Prime Bank Cricket Club, Kalabagan Cricket Academy, He also played for Victoria Sporting Club, Legends of Rupganj, Comilla Victorians, Gazi Group.

Career 
He has played 10 Tests and 9 ODIs in his entire playing career. Five and a half years after taking part in the one-day international series in Zimbabwe, India are on tour. He holds the record for most first-class matches among Bangladesh fast bowlers. He has taken 393 wickets in 132 matches. There are more records next to Sharif's name. No other fast bowler in the country has the reputation of taking 5 wickets 15 times in the first class. He also did a hat trick. He has scored 3,222 runs in 199 innings with the bat. There are 10 half-centuries with 1 century.

International career 
He made his Test and ODI debut against Zimbabwe in April 2001. He played in ten Tests and nine ODIs for the Bangladeshi cricket team. He was called in the national side after five years for the Bangladesh tour of Zimbabwe for ODIs, and was recalled for Tests after five and a half years for the Indian tour of Bangladesh. He last played for Bangladesh in 2007.

International One Day Cricket Match lists:

 1st Match Bangladesh vs. Zimbabwe on 05/04/2001 in Harare. (Zimbabwe)
 2nd Match Bangladesh vs. Zimbabwe on 08/04/2001 in Harare. (Zimbabwe)
 3rd Match Bangladesh vs. Zimbabwe on 11/04/2001 in Bulawayo. (Zimbabwe)
 4th Match Bangladesh vs. Zimbabwe on 23/11/2001 in Chattogram. (Bangladesh )
 5th Match Bangladesh vs. Zimbabwe on 26/11/2001 in Bangobandhu National Cricket stadium Dhaka. ( Bangladesh )
 6th Match Bangladesh vs. Pakistan on 22/1/2002 in Chattogram. (Bangladesh )
 7th Match Bangladesh vs. Pakistan on 24/1/2002 in Bangobandhu National Cricket stadium Dhaka. ( Bangladesh )
 8th Match Bangladesh vs. Pakistan on 25/1/2002 in Bangobandhu National Cricket stadium Dhaka. ( Bangladesh )
 9th Match Bangladesh vs. Zimbabwe on 9/2/2007 in Harare. (Zimbabwe)

International Test Cricket Match lists:

 1st Match Bangladesh vs. Zimbabwe from 19 April to 22 April 2001 in Zulawayo. ( Zimbabwe )
 2nd Match Bangladesh vs. Zimbabwe from 26 April to 30 April 2001 in Harare. ( Zimbabwe )
 3rd Match Bangladesh vs. Pakistan from 29 August to 31 August 2001 in Multan. ( Pakistan )
 4th Match Bangladesh vs. Sri Lanka from 6 September to 8 September 2001 in Colombo. (Sri Lanka )
 5th Match Bangladesh vs. Zimbabwe from 15 November to 19 November 2001 in Chattogram. ( Bangladesh )
 6th Match Bangladesh vs. New Zealand from 18 December to 22 December 2001 in Hamilton. (New Zealand )
 8th Match Bangladesh vs. Pakistan from 9 January to 13 January 2002 in Dhaka. (Bangladesh)
 9th Match Bangladesh vs. Pakistan from 16 January to 20 January 2002 in Chattogram. (Bangladesh)
 10th Match Bangladesh vs. India from 25 May to 27 May 2007 in Dhaka. (Bangladesh)
 11th Match Bangladesh vs. India from 3 July to 5 July 2007 in Colombo(Pss) (Sri Lanka)

Domestic Career 
He played 132 First-class cricket, 119 List A cricket and 22 T20 matches. In February 2018, he took a hat-trick, bowling for Legends of Rupganj against Gazi Group Cricketers in the 2017–18 Dhaka Premier Division Cricket League. It was his second hat-trick in List A cricket. He was the leading wicket-taker for Brothers Union in the 2018–19 Dhaka Premier Division Cricket League tournament, with 14 dismissals in 9 matches.

Dhaka Premiere League (DPL) 

 Bangladesh Biman – (2000- 2005)
 Surjotorun –(2005-2006)
 Sonargaon Cricketers –(2006-2007)
 Victoria Sporting – (2007-2008)
 Kalabagan Cricketers – (2008-2009)
 Kalabagan Krira Chakra – ( 2009–2011)
 Prime Bank- (2011-2012)
 Kalabagan Krira Chakra -(2012-2014)
 Gazi Group Cricketers –(2014-2015)
 Legends of Rupganj –( 2015–2017)
 Brothers Union-( 2017–2019)

Bangladesh Premiere League ( BPL ) 
 Played 22 T20 matches in BPL ( Bangladesh Premier League )
 Played for Rangpur Riders in 2012.
 Played for Comilla Victorians in 2016.
 Played for Sylhet Sixers in 2017.

Test Cricket Career

One Day Cricket Career

References

1985 births
Living people
Bangladesh Test cricketers
Bangladesh One Day International cricketers
Bangladeshi cricketers
Dhaka Division cricketers
Biman Bangladesh Airlines cricketers
Barisal Division cricketers
Rangpur Riders cricketers
Kala Bagan Cricket Academy cricketers
Gazi Group cricketers
Victoria Sporting Club cricketers
Prime Bank Cricket Club cricketers
ICL Bangladesh XI cricketers
Dhaka Warriors cricketers
Bangladesh Central Zone cricketers
Khulna Division cricketers
Legends of Rupganj cricketers
Brothers Union cricketers
People from Narayanganj District